The Copa del Rey de Baloncesto 2011–12 was the 76th edition of the Spanish King's Basketball Cup. It was managed by the ACB League and was held in Barcelona, in the Palau Sant Jordi on February 16–19.

It was the first time the Cup was played in Barcelona since 1986.

Bracket

Quarterfinals

Semifinals

Final

References and notes

External links
ACB website

Copa del Rey de Baloncesto
2011–12 in Spanish basketball cups